Brachycephalus nodoterga, also known as the Serra Cantareira saddleback toad, is a species of frog in the family Brachycephalidae.

Description
This tiny toad has bumpy skin and an overall yellow-orange colour, with its upperparts generally tending towards a duller and darker brownish-green hue. Unlike the more conspicuously coloured B. ephippium and B. pernix, studies of B. nodoterga have not detected toxins in its skin or organs.

Habitat and conservation
Little is known about its behavior, but like other saddleback toads it lives among leaf litter. Its conservation status was last reviewed by the IUCN in 2004 where regarded as data deficient (insufficient information for rating it), but an independent review in 2019 that used IUCN's criteria recommended that B. nodoterga should be recognised as vulnerable.

References

nodoterga
Frogs of South America
Amphibians of Brazil
Endemic fauna of Brazil
Amphibians described in 1920
Taxa named by Alípio de Miranda-Ribeiro
Taxonomy articles created by Polbot